Coleophora satellitella is a moth of the family Coleophoridae. It is found in Libya.

References

satellitella
Endemic fauna of Libya
Moths described in 1960
Moths of Africa